Fritz Nieden (1883 – 1942) was a German zoologist who specialized in African herpetology.

He worked as a zoologist at the Museum für Naturkunde in Berlin. His name is associated with Nieden's dwarf skink, Panaspis megalurus. In 1911 he was the first to describe Callulina kreffti, a species of frog, which until 2004 was the only known species of the genus Callulina.

The Sagala caecilian, Boulengerula niedeni, is named after him.

Selected writings
Die Amphibienfauna von Kamerun (1908), Mitteilungen aus dem Zoologischen Museum in Berlin 3: 491–518 ("Amphibian fauna of Cameroon")
Die Reptilien (außer den Schlangen) und Amphibien, 1910 - Reptiles (other than snakes) and amphibians.	
Gymnophoina (Amphibia apoda), 1913 - Gymnophiona (caecilians).
Amphibia : Anura I subordo Aglossa und Phanerglossa, sectio 1 Arcifera, 1923 - Anura I, suborders Aglossa and Phaneroglossa. 
Amphibia. Anura II. Engystomatidae ... Mit 55 Abbildungen, 1926 - Anura II, Engystomatidae.

References

German herpetologists
1942 deaths
1883 births
20th-century German zoologists